Khakassian Che (Ӌ ӌ; italics: Ӌ ӌ) is a letter of the Cyrillic script. Its form is derived from the Cyrillic letter Che (Ч ч Ч ч).

Computing codes

See also
Cyrillic characters in Unicode

References